The 2013 Trabzon Cup (2) was a professional tennis tournament played on outdoor hard courts. It was the first edition of the tournament which was part of the 2013 ITF Women's Circuit, offering a total of $50,000 in prize money. It took place in Trabzon, Turkey, on 9–15 September 2013. This event was the second Trabzon Cup of the year, the 2013 Trabzon Cup (1) occurred a week before. This counts as the first tournament of the second Trabzon Cup.

WTA entrants

Seeds 

 1 Rankings as of 26 August 2013

Other entrants 
The following players received wildcards into the singles main draw:
  Yağmur Akdemir
  Cemre Anıl
  Öykü Boz
  Deniz Paykoç

The following players received entry from the qualifying draw:
  Ekaterine Gorgodze
  Petra Krejsová
  Shakhlo Saidova
  Marina Shamayko

The following players received entry into the singles main draw as lucky losers:
  Ani Amiraghyan
  Ekaterina Yashina

Champions

Singles 

  Anna-Lena Friedsam def.  Yuliya Beygelzimer 4–6, 6–3, 6–3

Doubles 

  Oksana Kalashnikova /  Aleksandra Krunić def.  Ani Amiraghyan /  Dalila Jakupović 6–2, 6–1

External links 
 2013 Trabzon Cup (2) at ITFtennis.com

2013 ITF Women's Circuit
2013
2013 in Turkish tennis